The Reusch Medal is a medal awarded by the Norwegian Geological Society to young researchers in recognition of a high-quality treatise on geology. It has been awarded since 4 January 1926 in honor of the geologist Hans Henrik Reusch (1852–1922).

See also

 List of geology awards

References

Norwegian awards
Geology awards
Awards established in 1926